Loe Banr, also spelt Loebanr, is a village in Swat District of Khyber Pakhtunkhwa. It is located at 34°44'50N 72°23'30E with an altitude of 1085 metres (3562 feet). Italian archaeologists have unearthed ancient tombs and other things in the area.

References

Populated places in Swat District
Indo-Aryan archaeological sites